Fleishman Is in Trouble is an American drama streaming television miniseries created by Taffy Brodesser-Akner based on her 2019 novel of the same name. The series premiered on FX on Hulu on November 17, 2022.

Premise
Toby Fleishman is a recently divorced man in his forties using dating apps for the first time. As he begins to find romantic success he never achieved in his youth, his ex-wife Rachel disappears without a trace, leaving him with their kids. While Toby juggles looking after his children, a promotion at the hospital where he works, and all the potential sexual partners in Manhattan, he realizes that he'll never be able to figure out what happened to his wife until he can be more honest about what happened to their marriage in the first place.

Cast and characters

Main
 Jesse Eisenberg as Dr. Toby Fleishman
 Lizzy Caplan as Libby, one of Toby's best friends, who also serves as narrator of the story
 Claire Danes as Rachel, Toby's ex-wife
 Maxim Jasper Swinton as Solly, Toby's son
 Meara Mahoney Gross as Hannah, Toby's daughter
 Adam Brody as Seth, one of Toby's best friends

Recurring
 Josh Stamberg as Sam Rothberg
 Joy Suprano  as Cyndi Leffer
 Michael Gaston as Dr. Bartuck
 Juani Feliz as Alejandra Lopez, Broadway star and Rachel's client
 Ava Yaghmaie as Joanie, resident doctor at Toby's hospital
 Ralph Adriel Johnson as Phillip
 Brian Miskell as Clay
 Christian Slater as Archer Sylvan, author at a magazine Libby used to work for
 Josh Radnor as Adam, Libby's husband
 Mozhan Marnò as Nahid

Episodes

Production

Development
On September 12, 2019, it was announced that ABC Signature had won a 10-studio bidding war for the rights to the novel Fleishman Is in Trouble, with the project being developed for FX. Taffy Brodesser-Akner, the author of the original novel, was attached to write the adaptation as well as executive produce the project alongside Susannah Grant, Carl Beverly, and Sarah Timberman. On March 11, 2021, it was announced that the project was given a limited series order consisting of nine episodes, with the series now set to premiere exclusively on Hulu as part of FX on Hulu. Upon the series order announcement, Brodesser-Akner said:

On August 13, 2021, during FX Networks' Summer 2021 TCA Press Tour panel, it was announced that Little Miss Sunshine filmmaking duo Jonathan Dayton and Valerie Faris were attached to direct multiple episodes of the series.

The limited series was released on November 17, 2022, with the first two episodes available immediately and the rest debuting on a weekly basis.

Casting
In November 2021, Lizzy Caplan and Jesse Eisenberg joined the cast of the series in series regular roles, marking their second collaboration together after Now You See Me 2. In January 2022, Claire Danes and Adam Brody joined the cast in series regular roles, while Maxim Jasper Swinton and Meara Mahoney Gross joined the cast in recurring roles. In February 2022, Joy Suprano joined the cast in a recurring role. In March 2022, Michael Gaston, Ralph Adriel Johnson and Brian Miskell joined in recurring roles. In April 2022, Christian Slater and Josh Radnor joined the cast in recurring roles.

Filming
Principal photography began by February 2022, in New York City.

Reception

Critical response
The review aggregator website Rotten Tomatoes reported an 86% approval rating with an average rating of 8.2/10, based on 50 critic reviews. The website's critics consensus reads, "The characters Fleishman Is in Trouble spends time with aren't the most likable bunch, but the series examines their foibles with compelling insight—and they're brought to life by a terrific trio of stars." Metacritic, which uses a weighted average, assigned a score of 79 out of 100 based on 25 critics, indicating "generally favorable reviews".

Annie Berke of The A.V. Club gave the series an A− and said, "These eight episodes and the characters in them are doing their best, and Fleishman's best is far better than most." Richard Roeper of Chicago Sun-Times gave the series 3 out of 4 stars and wrote, "This is an exceedingly well-cast show, with Eisenberg, Danes, Caplan and Brody all playing to their strengths and hitting notes we've seen them master in previous roles."

According to Ross Douthat, writing for The New York Times, the show highlights the fine class gradations within the modern meritocracy, the psychology of meritocratic ambition, and the crucial, stressful role that marriage plays as a mechanism of social advancement. The show portrays the "privileged angst" faced by those who make hundreds of thousands of dollars annually but face lifestyle inflation and the demands of wealth without its promised security and ease. Similar analysis was presented by Caitlin Moscatello in The Cut.

Accolades

References

External links
 

2020s American drama television miniseries
2022 American television series debuts
2022 American television series endings
English-language television shows
FX on Hulu original programming
Television series about marriage
Television series based on American novels
Television series by ABC Signature Studios
Television shows set in Manhattan